A machine head is part of the tuning mechanism of some stringed instruments.

Machine Head or Machinehead may also refer to:

Music 
 Machine Head (band), an American heavy metal band
 Machine Head (album), a 1972 album by Deep Purple
 "Machinehead" (song), a 1996 song by Bush

Films 
 Machine Head (film), a 2000 independent horror film

Comics and animation 
 "Machine Head", an episode of the anime series Bubblegum Crisis Tokyo 2040
 Machine Head, a fictional crime boss in the comic book series Invincible

Video games 
Blam! Machinehead, released in the United States as Machine Head, 1996 video game

See also 
 Machin series or "Machin head", a series of UK postage stamps